Inuit Tapiriit Kanatami v Parliament and Council (2013) C-583/11 is an EU law case, concerning judicial review in the European Union.

Facts
The claimants, Inuit Tapiriit Kanatami, a non-profit Canadian organisation representing over 50,000 Inuit, challenged a regulation of Parliament and Council on seal products. They further argued that to not be allowed a claim under TFEU art 263(4) would be inconsistent with the CFREU art 47 on an effective remedy.

The General Court rejected the application, because it challenged a regulation made as a legislative act under TFEU art 289, and this was not a 'regulatory' act under art 263(4). This meant the claimants would have to show individual as well as direct concern.

Judgment
The Grand Chamber of the Court of Justice, upholding the General Court, held that a 'legislative act' is defined by the procedure used to adopt it, not on a functional basis.

See also

European Union law

Notes

References

Court of Justice of the European Union case law